Hetepti is the mother of the Ancient Egyptian king Amenemhat IV. She is only known from a depiction in the temple of Medinet Madi, that was built and decorated under Amenemhat III and his successor Amenemhat IV. There she is simply king's mother, united with the white crown, lady of the two lands and noble lady (iry-pat) in a context where it is clear that she was the mother of Amenemhat IV. The inscription is partly destroyed. It is possible that parts of her titles are missing, but also parts of her name might be destroyed.

Notes

References 
 
 

19th-century BC women
People of the Twelfth Dynasty of Egypt